Thailand competed at the 2011 World Aquatics Championships in Shanghai, China between July 16 and 31, 2011.

Swimming

Thailand qualified 3 swimmers.

Men

Women

Synchronised swimming

Thailand has qualified 12 athletes in synchronised swimming.

Women

Reserves
Aphichaya Saengrusamee
Arpapat Saengrusamee

References

World A
Nations at the 2011 World Aquatics Championships
Thailand at the World Aquatics Championships